Orkun Uşak (born November 5, 1980) is a Turkish football goalkeeper who currently plays for Mersin İdmanyurdu SK. He is a product of the youth system of Galatasaray. He also played for Beykozspor, Bakırköyspor, Anadolu Üsküdar, Elazığspor, Ankaragücü, Kayseri Erciyesspor, Galatasaray, Manisaspor, Konyaspor and Kardemir Karabükspor. On 1 February 2012, he joined Antalyaspor for the rest of the season.

Career

Club career
He signed a three-year contract with the Turkish club on the 20th of June 2007. His spectacular performance with his previous team enabled him to obtain a place in the international squad. Before coming to Galatasaray, he played 16 games for Kayseri Erciyesspor and received 10 goals.

International career
He has one cap to his account.

Honours
Galatasaray
 Süper Lig: 2007–08
 Turkish Super Cup: 2008

External links
 
 

Living people
1980 births
Turkish footballers
Turkey international footballers
Süper Lig players
Bakırköyspor footballers
Beykozspor footballers
Elazığspor footballers
MKE Ankaragücü footballers
Galatasaray S.K. footballers
Manisaspor footballers
Konyaspor footballers
Kardemir Karabükspor footballers
Antalyaspor footballers
Association football goalkeepers
TFF First League players